Storage Wars (stylized as STORAGE WAR$) is an American reality television competition series that airs on the A&E network. It initially aired for twelve seasons, from December 1, 2010, to January 30, 2019. A  season premiered in April 2021.

When rent is not paid on a storage locker for three months in California, the contents can be sold by an auctioneer as a single lot of items in the form of a cash-only auction. The show follows professional buyers who visit storage facilities throughout the state and bid on these lockers. Before each locker is auctioned, the buyers are given five minutes to inspect the contents from the doorway, but may not enter the locker or touch any of the items.

After the day's auctions are completed, the winning bidders' sort through the lockers, estimating the prices they will set on the contents and/or consulting with experts for an appraisal of unusual items. Running totals on-screen display the cost versus the estimated total value, and a final tally at the end of the episode summarizes the buyers' net profit or loss.

History  

Thom Beers is the executive producer and narrator of the show. He provides a quick explanation of the show's premise at the beginning and does a recap of the featured buyers' profits or losses at the end of each episode. He has stated that the series avoids delving into behind-the-scenes stories of the lockers' original owners because "all you see is misery there, and I didn't want to trade on that". In the United States, Storage Wars premiered on A&E on December 1, 2010. It can also be seen internationally, as AETN International sold the series to several channels in Singapore, Canada, Croatia, Australia, the United Kingdom, Ireland, the Netherlands, Sweden, Finland, Norway, Italy, Portugal, Poland, Germany, Spain, France, Denmark, New Zealand, Brazil, Argentina, Russia, India and Turkey.

Season one of Storage Wars consisted of 19 episodes, 17 of which were filmed at various self-storage facilities throughout Southern California. The show has enjoyed ratings success, and its second-season premiere attracted 5.1million total viewers, making it the most-watched program in A&E's history to that point.

Storage Wars was recommissioned for another 26-episode season in January 2012, with the season officially premiering on June 5, 2012. Only 20 of the 26 episodes were aired however, with six of the episodes being held back for broadcast during the second half of the show's  season which began airing on December 4, 2012. In March 2013, four early season four special episodes aired before the official launch of season four, which premiered on April 16, 2013.

Storage Wars concluded its  season on January 30, 2019, and there initially was no news regarding a season renewal. A  season was eventually announced in March 2021 and premiered on April 20.  Season 14 premiered on November 2, 2021.

Aside from the original series, two modified versions were also released. In 2015, buyer Barry Weiss starred in Storage Wars: Barry Strikes Back, in which he and his auction friend Kenny Crossley reviewed and add new commentary for past episodes of the series. In 2019, A&E began airing "best of..." episodes titled Storage Wars: Back to the Locker. It focuses on the buyers' best and worst storage unit purchases grouped by theme ("Child's Play", "Art of the Deal", etc.).

Spin-offs 

Several spin-off series were also produced, most of them airing on A&E:

 Storage Wars: Texas (2011–14)
 Storage Wars: New York (2013)
 Storage Wars: Canada (originally aired on OLN from 2013 to 2015; re-runs aired as Storage Wars: Northern Treasures on A&E)
 Barry'd Treasure (2014)
 Brandi & Jarrod: Married to the Job (2014)
 Storage Wars: Miami (2015)
 Storage Wars France: Enchères surprises (aired on 6ter)

Participants

Main buyers

Dave Hester  

Dave Hester, also known as The Mogul (seasons 1–3; seasons 5–12): At the start of the series, Hester owned Newport Consignment Gallery in Costa Mesa, California and the Rags to Riches thrift store, but closed them in June 2011. He now operates his own auction house, Dave Hester Auctions. Hester has had confrontations with the other main buyers, especially Darrell and Brandon Sheets, and is known to frequently raise bids when somebody else wants to buy a storage unit. Hester's son Dave Jr. occasionally appeared on the show with him. Dave Hester's signature catchword is a loud "YUUUP!" when making a bid. He has this word imprinted on his trucks, T-shirts, and hats. Hester's call originated from him being a bid-catcher in auction facilities, helping auctioneers spot bidders in a crowd. In December 2012, Hester was fired from the show, and sued the show's producers for wrongful termination; part of his lawsuit was tossed out in March 2013. Hester didn't appear in the fourth season but returned for season five.

Darrell Sheets  

Darrell Sheets, also known as The Gambler (seasons 1–): A storage auction veteran from San Diego. His catchphrase is "This is the WOW factor!" and he makes the occasional malapropism. He makes his living by selling items from his purchased lockers at his weekly swap meet, and through his online store. In the season-two special "Unlocked: Sell High", Darrell revealed that he once found a plastic-wrapped human corpse in a storage locker. It was determined that the previous owner of the locker had murdered his wife and left her in the unit.

Brandon Sheets  

Brandon Sheets, also known as The Sidebet (seasons 1–9): Darrell Sheets' son and partner, who often accompanies him to the auctions. In later seasons, Brandon attended auctions on his own and also bid against his father for the same units. Sheets announced on December 20, 2016, that he would be leaving the show after the ninth season due to budget cuts. As of 2018, Brandon works as a real estate agent in Arizona.

Jarrod Schulz and Brandi Passante  

Jarrod Schulz (seasons 1—13) and Brandi Passante (seasons 1–), also known as The Young Guns: At the start of the series, Schulz and Passante owned and operated the "Now and Then" thrift store in Orange, California. In the fourth season, they opened a second location in Long Beach, California, but in the premiere of season five, it was revealed that the Long Beach store had not made a profit since opening day, putting the pair in financial jeopardy. The Long Beach store was shown to have closed during the opening segment of the episode aired on April 8, 2014. Their Orange store was also permanently closed in early 2016. On April 24, 2014, A&E premiered the special Brandi & Jarrod: Married to the Job, which focused on the two balancing running their business and raising their two children. The special led to a spin-off series of the same name, premiering on August 12, 2014. Though identified on screen as husband and wife in some episodes, Schulz and Passante have never actually married. They have two children, Cameron and Payton. In the season 13 premiere, it is revealed that Jarrod and Brandi had broken up, but continued to bid separately.

Barry Weiss  

Barry Weiss, also known as The Collector (seasons 1–4; season 14): Weiss and his brother owned a successful produce company until he retired. Weiss is a lifelong antiques collector, but he had never bought a storage unit until his friend and Storage Wars executive producer and narrator Thom Beers suggested that he join the show. On June 25, 2013, it was reported that Weiss would not return to the show for season five and that he was leaving the series. In February 2014, A&E announced that Weiss would be starring in his own spin-off series, titled Barry'd Treasure. Weiss is godfather to Jesse James, the customizer and firearms manufacturer. He is also the "official spokesperson" and "brand ambassador" for Sherwood Valley Casino in Willits, California. He returned in season 14 as a regular on the first episode.

Ivy Calvin  

Ivy Calvin, also known as The King (seasons 3–): Calvin joined the show during season three just after Dave Hester's departure, and became one of the main buyers during season five. A former mixed martial arts (MMA) fighter and arena football player, he owns the Grandma's Attic thrift store in Palmdale, California. Calvin's son, Ivy Jr., often joins him on the show. Calvin also often teams up with Mary Padian, whom he refers to as his "BFF".

Rene Nezhoda and Casey Nezhoda  

Rene Nezhoda and Casey Nezhoda, also known as The Bargain Hunters (seasons 4–): The husband-and-wife team joined the show during season four, and became main buyers in season five. A native of Germany, Rene owned the Bargain Hunters thrift store in Poway, California near San Diego until its closing in 2021. As of the ninth season, Casey only appears as a semi-regular cast member, with Rene often attending the auctions by himself. They have two children.

Mary Padian  

Mary Padian, also known as The Junkster (seasons 5–12): A former regular of the spin-off series Storage Wars: Texas, Padian joined the cast in season five, appearing in three episodes while on a visit to Long Beach in January 2014. In the sixth season, Padian became a main buyer. Mary Padian is the proprietor of Mary's Finds, an antique and furniture restoration business. Several episodes have shown Padian restoring items taken from the units she has purchased, through to the sale to the intended buyer. Padian is close friends with Ivy Calvin, who she often calls "BFF". In season 12, she teams up with Jenny Grumbles, a former Storage Wars: Texas buyer, to purchase a unit. In season 13, Padian was a guest on the first episode.

Kenny Crossley  

Kenny Crossley (seasons 10–): Having formerly appeared as a recurring guest throughout seasons two to four, Crossley returned in the tenth season to become one of the main buyers. Crossley hails from New Orleans, Louisiana, where he worked for the Sheriff's Department. Leaving law enforcement behind, Crossley moved out to Los Angeles, California, where he managed storage facilities. Crossley initially formed an early alliance with Barry Weiss, after helping him to open a jammed locker. The pair became close friends, with Crossley even going on to appear with Weiss in Barry'd Treasure and Storage Wars: Barry Strikes Back. Outside of storage units, Crossley owns a business making his own pralines, and owns a clothing line with the tag "Kenny Do It", many designs of which he is often seen wearing on the show.

Shana Dahan and Edwina Registre 

Shana Dahan and Edwina Registre, also known as The Vegas Ladies (seasons 11–12): High school friends Dahan and Registre joined the show in its eleventh season, becoming two of the three new stars appointed by the network. By trade, both Dahan and Registre are insurance brokers; they often attend auctions in their spare time, having developed a love of vintage collectibles at a young age. The pair also run a YouTube channel called "Thrifters Anonymous", where they document items found in either storage units or thrift stores.

Justin Bryant  

Justin Bryant, also known as The Rookie (seasons 11–12): Justin was one of three new stars appointed by the network for season eleven. Bryant is the youngest buyer ever to appear on the show at the age of 22. Bryant was inspired to make a name for himself in the storage business after watching the show and developing a love for buying storage units. Since starting, Bryant has used the profits from the units he has purchased to help buy his mother a new home and also employed his older brother.

Recurring buyers

Nabila Haniss  

Nabila Haniss, also known as Paris Hilton (seasons 2—4): Haniss is a lifelong buyer from Culver City, California, who received attention after purchasing a storage unit that contained items belonging to socialite Paris Hilton. She has since also obtained a unit belonging to television and social media personality Tila Tequila. Haniss appeared as a recurring buyer throughout seasons two to four, often going head-to-head with Dave Hester.

Mark Balelo 

Mark Balelo, also known as Rico Suave (seasons 2—4): Balelo owned a liquidation, wholesale, and distribution company, and an auction house, and also formerly owned a gaming store called "The Game Exchange" from 2009 to 2012. He earned the nickname "Rico Suave" for his tendency to dress in fancy clothes at storage auctions. Balelo appeared three times during the second season, five times in the third season, and three times in the fourth season, which was filmed shortly before his death by suicide.

Jeff Jarred  

Jeff Jarred (season 3): Jarred is the owner of the "It's New To You" antique and thrift store, that he runs with his daughter in Burbank, California. He has often fought with Dan Dotson, after accusing him of using sneaky tactics at auctions to allow regular bidders to win units. However, he and Dotson decided to make peace in the third season. He appeared six times during the third season.

Herb Brown and Mike Karlinger  

Herb Brown and Mike Karlinger, also known as The Tank Top Twins (seasons 3—4): Brown and Karlinger are brothers-in-law, who developed a taste for buying units after attending an auction one day out of boredom. They appeared three times in the third season, in the episodes "Portrait of the Gambler", "Nobody's Vault but Mine" and "Still Nobody's Vault but Mine", and three times in the fourth season, in the episodes "Old Tricks, New Treats", "Orange You Glad Dan Sold It Again?" and "That's My Jerry!". Brown and Karlinger also made an uncredited appearance in the episode "Jurassic Bark" where they pranked Dave Hester and earned the nickname the "tank top twins".

Mark and Matt Harris  

Mark Harris and Matt Harris, also known as The Harris Brothers (seasons 3—4): Mark and Matt are identical twins who first appeared in "May the Vaults Be with You" as an appraiser for Barry Weiss when Weiss found a Return of the Jedi jacket in a locker. Since then, the Harris brothers have appeared as recurring buyers throughout the third and fourth seasons. They first appeared as buyers in the episode "The Kook, The Chief, His Son, and The Brothers". The self-proclaimed "Kings of Swag", the Harris brothers specialize in Hollywood memorabilia. They have a company called WOW! Creations, which specializes in celebrity gift bags. They appeared five times in the fourth season in the episodes "Oysters on the Half Plate", "The Shrining", "The French Job", "There's No Place Like Homeland", and "Total Wine Domination".

Gunter Nezhoda  

Gunter Nezhoda (season 8—) is Rene Nezhoda's father who appears alongside Rene in several episodes. Gunter is also of Germanic descent. Like Darrell Sheet's sidekick Chad, Gunter Nezhoda provides the occasional comic relief to Rene but is generally well-meaning as Gunter learns his way through the business. Before his appearance on Storage Wars, Nezhoda worked as a Bass player for artists like Pat Travers, Leslie West, Kevin DuBrow, George Lynch, and Michael Schenker, as well as a photographer and has worked in several films as an actor.

Chad  

Chad (seasons 10—11) appears as Darrell Sheets' sidekick in several episodes. In a contrast to the more serious and leveled Brandon Sheets, Chad is kind of a doofus and provides comic relief, as well as a seeming frustration to Darrell Sheets, who is teaching Chad the business. Chad frequently spouts out secrets and makes silly assumptions and comments. He is willing to try out some of Darrell Sheets' more dangerous storage locker finds with childlike enthusiasm.

Auctioneers  

Dan Dotson and Laura Dotson are a husband and wife auctioneer team, who run their own business, American Auctioneers, and are the primary auctioneers on the show. Dan has been a professional auctioneer since 1974. He is the primary auctioneer of the two, occasionally giving the reins to Laura, and Laura ends all the auctions by reminding the winning bidders, "Don't forget to pay the lady!" A substitute auctioneer has filled in for the Dotson's on two occasions: in the season five episode "The Daneurysm" (2014), after Dan suffered an aneurysm; and in the season eight episode "Palm Springs Throwdown" (2015), after the Dotson's both got into a physical fight with regular auction buyer Dave Hester.

Other auctioneers have also appeared on the show. Earl and Johan Graham are a father-daughter auctioneer team, who appeared in six episodes in season four, as the network tried to shake up the show by introducing some new cast members. They appeared in the episodes "The Monster Hash", "The Shrining", "Barry's Angels", "That's My Jerry!", "Total Wine Domination" and "Fear and Loathing in Placentia". They did not return for season five.

Emily Wears-Kroul was appointed as a new semi-regular auctioneer from the tenth season to the twelfth. Wears was only 17 years old when she finished auction school and is one of the youngest auctioneers currently working in the business. Wears runs her own auction business in Solon, Iowa with her father, who is a lifelong bid caller. Wears also appeared as a singing contestant during the 15th season of the TV talent show American Idol. Wears married in 2017, and is close friends with auction buyer Mary Padian.

Episodes

Reception

Critical response  

Critical response was mixed, with Mary McNamara of the Los Angeles Times calling Storage Wars "a strangely uplifting showhope being one of the many things one can apparently find in an abandoned storage unit," and Neil Genzlinger of The New York Times called the series "an especially entertaining addition to the genre." Brian Lowry of Variety said that Wars' should have been left in storage, indefinitely." Writing for Slate magazine, Troy Patterson gave a mixed review, referring to the series as "trash TV" as well as "trivial and magnetic." Ellen Gray of the Philadelphia Daily News suggested "if there's an acquisitive bone in your body, you should probably steer clear".

Ratings  

The first-season premiere episode drew 2.1million viewers and the show was A&E's top-rated non-fiction show for 2010, with an average of 2.4million viewers. The season two premiere consisted of back-to-back new episodes of the show; the second show drew 5.1million total viewers and was the highest rating for an episode of a series in A&E history. The combined season premiere outperformed competing original episodes of NBC's Love in the Wild and ABC's Primetime Nightline.

Concerns about authenticity  

Some critics have speculated that some of the units have been stocked by producers, but an A&E publicist said: "There is no staging involved. The items uncovered in the storage units are the actual items featured on the show". Executive producer Thom Beers has stated that the vast majority of the storage lockers investigated during production contain nothing of interest and therefore do not appear in the final show. However, Beers admitted that half of the lines are scripted, and so is moving items between storage lockers purchased by the same person.

Lawsuits  

In December 2012, a main auction buyer, Dave Hester, filed a lawsuit against A&E and Original Productions, claiming that the producers staged entire units, planted items in lockers after having them appraised weeks in advance, and funneled cash to weaker teams to buy lockers that they could not have otherwise afforded. The suit claims that Hester and other cast members met with network officials to express concerns that those actions violated federal laws that are intended to prevent viewers from being deceived when watching a show involving intellectual skills.

In January 2013, rather than deny the accusations, A&E responded by stating that its composition of the show is covered by the First Amendment and that Hester's claims do not apply; the network also said that the Communications Act of 1934 is inapplicable to cable television, which did not exist in 1934, and that the TV format of Storage Wars involves no "chance", "intellectual knowledge", or "intellectual skill" and so is not a game show. A&E also stated that there are "notable inconsistencies in [Hester's] exaggerated self-portrait", referring to his claims of value on the items that he finds in lockers.

In March 2013, A&E won a partial victory in the suit when a federal judge tossed out Hester's claim of unfair business practices, calling the show "expressive free speech", and stating that his claim of wrongful termination was not specific enough. Hester was ordered to pay the legal fees for A&E.

On September 3, 2013, Hester had one of his claims approved by Los Angeles Superior Court judge Michael Johnson. The court ruled that Hester "can move forward with the wrongful termination portion of his wide-ranging lawsuit against A&E and the producers of Storage Wars."

On July 15, 2014, it was announced that Hester and A&E came to a settlement, setting the stage for his return to the show on August 12, 2014.

Spoofs  

 The show was parodied on the Adult Swim sketch show Loiter Squad season 3 episode "Tombstone"
 It was also parodied as Storage Battles on The Simpsons season 24 episode titled "Gorgeous Grampa", where Homer Simpson got addicted to the series and decided to participate in a storage auction
 In the season 7 of Animaniacs Yakko, Wakko and Dot walking onto Storage Wars and singing about the Bayeux Tapestry
 Mad Magazine has also parodied the series as Storage Boors (stylized Storage Boor$) as well as lampooning Dave Hester's lawsuit

See also  

 Auction Kings (Discovery Channel; 2010–13)
 Auction Hunters (Spike; 2010–15)
 Storage Hunters (TruTV; 2011–16)
 Baggage Battles (Travel Channel; 2012–16)

References

External links  

  at A&E
 

 
2010 American television series debuts
2010s American reality television series
A&E (TV network) original programming
Auction television series
English-language television shows
Television series by Fremantle (company)
Television series by Original Productions
Television shows set in California